The Institut Reine Astrid Mons is a higher school located in Mons, Belgium. The school is part of the Haute Ecole Roi Baudouin.

Degrees

 Bachelor's degree in Accounting
 Bachelor's degree in Computer Programming
 Bachelor's degree in Secretarial Management
 Bachelor's degree in Automotive Expertise and Thermal Engines

External links
 official website

Colleges in Belgium